The Fearless Lover is a 1925 American silent drama film directed by Scott R. Dunlap and Henry MacRae and starring William Fairbanks, Eva Novak, and Tom Kennedy.

Plot
As described in a film magazine reviews, Patrick Michael Casey, son of Sergeant Casey, whose record is the finest, joins the police force and is assigned to duty in the toughest section of the city with orders to make the crooks and gangsters hate the neighborhood. Tom Dugan, gang leader, annoys  Enid Sexton, telephone operator, and Casey stops him, telling him what will happen if he does not become a straight citizen. During telephone strike a boy is  struck by an automobile and dies because the wires are dead and a doctor cannot be called. Casey falls in love with Enid. Enid’s brother Ted joins Dugan’s gang when a silk robbery is being planned and is arrested. Casey gets his sergeant’s promise to let Ted off if Casey cleans up Dugan’s gang. Casey, alone, crashes into the gang’s hangout and goes to work with club and gun. He chases Dugan to the roof. The crook empties his gun at Casey. Casey then lays aside his gun and club, mauls Dugan into submission with his fists, and takes him to the station. Then he and Enid make plans to go to the church for a wedding.

Cast
 William Fairbanks as Patrick Michael Casey
 Eva Novak as Enid Sexton
 Tom Kennedy as Tom Dugan
 Lydia Knott as Mrs. James Sexton
 Arthur Rankin as Ted Sexton
 Frankie Darro as Frankie

References

Bibliography
 Langman, Larry. American Film Cycles: The Silent Era. Greenwood Publishing, 1998.

External links
 

1925 films
1925 drama films
1920s English-language films
American silent feature films
Silent American drama films
American black-and-white films
Columbia Pictures films
Films directed by Henry MacRae
Films directed by Scott R. Dunlap
1920s American films